The Rassemblement pour l'indépendance du Québec, or RIQ, is an association of citizens in favour of Quebec independence.

Founded in May 2000, it is purposely unaffiliated officially with any political party (like the Parti Québécois, the main Quebec independence party) or any political ideology outside sovereignty matters (despite the important links between the Quebec independence movement and the Quebec left). It did however support the Parti Québécois in the 2003 Quebec general election.  It also puts independence before any association projects with Canada (see also: Pur et dur).

See also 
Quebec sovereignty movement
Pur et dur
Quebec nationalism
Quebec politics
List of active autonomist and secessionist movements

External links
RIQ Blog's
Official website
Related works at Vigile.net

Civic and political organizations of Canada
Secessionist organizations in Canada